The province of Cosenza is a province in the Calabria region of southern Italy. Its capital is the city of Cosenza. It contains 150 comuni, listed at list of communes of the Province of Cosenza.

The province of Cosenza contains a community of Occitan language (also known as Langue d'oc) speakers in Guardia Piemontese: it was formed by Vaudoi or Waldensian movement members, who moved to Cosenza to avoid religious persecution, in the 13th and 14th centuries. Many of the Arbëreshë Albanians of Italy live in the province, since arriving in the 16th century to flee the religious persecution undertaken by the Ottoman Empire.

History
The first traces of human settlement in the area date from the early Palaeolithic period. These sites include the Romito Cave at Papasidero, including wall paintings of bovidae.

Cosenza began as a settlement of the Italic Bruttii tribe, and became their capital before the Romans invaded the area. The town was conquered by the Romans in 204 BC and was named Cosentia. Starting from the 8th century BC, the current provincial area became part of the so-called Greater Greece. Greek cities, including Sibari and Pandosia, were mostly located on the coastal area and at the foot of the Pollino massif.

King of the Visigoths Alaric I conquered the region during the later stages of the Western Roman Empire and according to legend, Alaric I is buried in Cosenza along with a large treasure hoard. Later Cosenza fell under the rule of the Byzantine Empire for a brief period of time, before being conquered by the Lombards, as part of the Duchy of Benevento. Roger II of Sicily made it the capital of Terra Giordana in the 12th century.

In Modern times, as part of the Kingdom of Naples and later of the Kingdom of Two Sicilies, the province remained mostly a rural area devoted to agriculture and animal husbandry. Feudalism was abolished only in the 19th century. The area was also seat to several forms of brigandage during the centuries.

References

External links
 Official website 

 
Cosenza